Billy the Cat may refer to:
 Billy the Cat (Belgian comics), a Franco-Belgian comic strip published by Spirou
 Billy the Cat (British comics), a British comic strip and adventure story published by The Beano
 Billy the Cat (TV series), a Belgian cartoon series based on the Belgian comic strip of the same name

See also 
 Billy (disambiguation)
 Bill the cat, a fictional cat appearing in the works of cartoonist Berkeley Breathed,